Bolshoye Yakovkovo is a rural locality (a village) in Vorobyovskoye Rural Settlement, Sokolsky District, Vologda Oblast, Russia. The population was 11 as of 2002.

Geography 
Bolshoye Yakovkovo is located 66 km northeast of Sokol (the district's administrative centre) by road. Vorobyovo is the nearest rural locality.

References 

Rural localities in Sokolsky District, Vologda Oblast